Wind Music, formerly Wind Records is an independent record label based in New Taipei City, Taiwan specializing in traditional Taiwanese and Chinese music.  The company has recorded a number of collections of documentary recordings, notably of the music of the minority peoples of Taiwan and China.

The company was founded in 1988 by flautist Ken Yang. Wind Music artists include musicians from both China and Taiwan, as well other countries. Wind Music's output is classified into six categories: traditional Chinese instrumental music, Chinese health music, ethnic music, Chinese religious music including Buddhist music, Chinese new-age music/Chinese ambient music, and Wind's popular collections.

Wind has recorded projects by artists such as Matthew Lien and founder Ken Yang himself.

Notes

External links
Wind Music official website 
 Wind Music official website 
"Wind Records is Taiwan’s most successful alternative music label." By Cheryl Robbins. Taiwan Formula. March 2003.
"An Exclusive Interview with Wind Records General Manager Ken Yang" with Rachel Chiou, translated by Cheryl Robbins.
"Matthew Lien - An Arctic Musician Strikes a Warm Chord with Taiwan." Sinorama. November 1999. p. 102.

1988 establishments in Taiwan
Taiwanese record labels
World music record labels
New-age music record labels
IFPI members